St. Anne's Hospital may refer to:
 St. Ann's Hospital, Dorset, psychiatric institution in Dorset, England
 St. Ann's Hospital, medical facility in Haringey, London
 Saint Anns Hospital, in Cuyahoga County of Cleveland, Ohio; see List of hospitals in Ohio
 St Anne's Hospital, Chicago; see List of hospitals in Illinois
 St. Anne's Hospital, early name for Mercy Hospital, Western Australia
 St Anne's Hospital, Zimbabwe; see List of hospitals in Zimbabwe
 St. Anne's Hospital, forerunner of St. Gertrude's Hospital, Copenhagen
 St. Anne's Hospital, part of St. Luke's Hospital, Rathgar, Ireland
 St. Anne's Hospital, Massachusetts; see List of hospitals in Massachusetts
 St. Anne's Hospital for the Insane, in Paris
 St. Ann's Hospital, in the Roman Catholic Diocese of Columbus, Ohio
 St. Anne's Hospital in Harare (city), Zimbabwe

See also
 Saint Anne (disambiguation)
 Church of St. Ann (disambiguation)